André Steensen (born 12 October 1987) is a Danish former professional racing cyclist who last rode for .

Palmarès

2006
7th Overall Thüringen Rundfahrt der U23
9th Overall Istrian Spring Trophy
2007
3rd Overall Tour de l'Avenir
10th Münsterland Giro
2011
8th Giro del Piemonte
2012
1st Overall Kreiz Breizh Elites
1st Stages 1 & 2 (ITT)
1st Points classification
1st Himmerland Rundt
1st Stage 2 Circuit des Ardennes
1st Stage 1 Flèche du Sud
2013
3rd Overall Boucle de l'Artois
2014
8th National Time Trial Championships

References

External links

1987 births
Living people
People from Skanderborg Municipality
Danish male cyclists
Sportspeople from the Central Denmark Region